Edwin Hansen was a Danish footballer who played in the Football League for Grimsby Town.

References

Danish men's footballers
English Football League players
Grimsby Town F.C. players
Køge Boldklub players
Danish expatriates in England
People from Køge Municipality
Danish expatriate men's footballers
Association football wingers
1920 births
1990 deaths
Sportspeople from Region Zealand